Beara tortriciformis is a moth in the family Nolidae first described by Strand in 1917. It is found in Taiwan, the north-eastern Himalayas, Peninsular Malaysia, Sumatra and Borneo.

References

Moths described in 1917
Chloephorinae